Bazar-i-Panjwai is a village and the center of Panjwayi District in Kandahar Province, Afghanistan. The population is about 5000. It is situated just south of the Arghandab River.

See also
Kandahar Province

References

External links

Populated places in Kandahar Province
Panjwayi District